The United Nations Nelson Rolihlahla Mandela Prize is awarded every five years by the United Nations on Mandela Day to two individuals, one woman and one man from different geographic regions, in recognition of their dedicated service to humanity, in the promotion of reconciliation and social cohesion, and in community development, guided by the purposes and principles of the UN. It was established in 2014 by a UN General Assembly resolution in honour of Nelson Mandela.

Nominations
Written nominations for the prize can be submitted by member states and observer states of the UN, entities and intergovernmental organizations, institutions of higher education, independent research centres and institutes, NGOs and laureates of the prize.

Staff members of any organization of the UN system are not eligible.

List of laureates
 2015: Helena Ndume (Namibia) and Jorge Sampaio (Portugal)
 2020: Marianna Vardinogiannis (Greece) and Morissanda Kouyaté (Guinea)

See also 

 List of awards for contributions to society
 List of humanitarian and service awards

References

External links
 Nelson Rolihlahla Mandela Prize

Awards established in 2014
United Nations Nelson
Awards for contributions to society
United Nations awards